Diploschistes scruposus (crater lichen) is a pale gray to white, warty to cracked (areolate) crustose lichen with black, urn-shaped (urceolate) fruiting bodies (apothecia). It is found worldwide on growing on rock (saxicolous) that is siliceous, in open areas in Mediterranean, temperate and polar areas, from the low tropics to high altitudes. It is in the Thelotremataceae family. In California, it is the most common member of the Diploschistes genus. It is not covered in a powdery white coating (epruinose), which distinguishes it from other members of the genus.

References

Ostropales
Lichen species
Lichens described in 1771
Taxa named by Johann Christian Daniel von Schreber